Ernemont-la-Villette is a commune in the Seine-Maritime department in the Normandy region in northern France.

Geography

Population

Places of interest
 A seventeenth-century stone cross.
 The Château d’Ernemont
 The eighteenth-century Château de Launay.
 The chapel at Launay, dating from the eighteenth century.
 The church of St.Martin, dating from the seventeenth century.

See also
Communes of the Seine-Maritime department

References

Communes of Seine-Maritime